Guy Stanton Ford (May 9, 1873 – December 29, 1962) was the sixth president of the University of Minnesota. Ford had originally come to the University of Minnesota in 1913, serving as the dean of the Graduate School and as a professor of history. He became president in 1938 after the sudden death of Lotus Coffman. He left the University of Minnesota in November 1941 to become the executive secretary of the American Historical Association in Washington, D.C. and Editor of American Historical Review (until 1953).

Ford's doctoral thesis (Columbia University, 1903) was entitled Hanover and Prussia, 1795–1803. A Study in Neutrality. Before he went to the University of Minnesota, he was a faculty member of Yale University and the University of Illinois. He was also a member of the Literary Society of Washington.

The annual Guy Stanton Ford Memorial Lecture is a public lecture by a distinguished scholar in any of many different fields.

References

External links
Guy Stanton Ford papers, University Archives, University of Minnesota - Twin Cities

University of Minnesota faculty
American historians
Presidents of the American Historical Association
Columbia University alumni
Yale University faculty
1873 births
1962 deaths
Academic journal editors
Presidents of the University of Minnesota